The Diocese of Visby is a division of the Church of Sweden consisting of the island of Gotland. Its seat is Visby Cathedral located in the largest town on Gotland, Visby.

The Bishop of Visby is also responsible for the episcopal oversight of the Church of Sweden Abroad (SKUT).

Bishops of Visby
1572–1589 Moritz Christensen Glad (Mauritius Christiani Lætus)
1586–1591 Petrus Johannis (Peder Hansen Riber)
1592–1596 David Hansson Bilefeld
1597–1599 Povel Andersen (Paulus Andræ Medelby)
1600–1601 Willatz Sörensson (Willadius Severini)
1601–1613 Lauritz Nielsøn Helsinburgicus
1615–1624 Antonius Johannis Kolding (Anton Hansen Kolding) 
1627–1631 Theodorus Erasmi (Thor Rasmussen) 
1631–1644 Oluff Fock (Olavus Phocas Staphrophski)
1645–1656 Hans Nilssøn Strelow
1656–1657 Niels Lauritzen Wallensis Gardeus
1657–1676 Johannes Brodinus
1676–1679 Hans Nilsson Endislöv
1679–1685 Haquin Spegel
1685–1692 Petrus Stjernman
1692–1709 Israel Kolmodin
1711–1734 Johan Esberg (Johannes Esbergius)
1735–1745 Georg Wallin d.y. (Jöran Wallin)
1745–1757 Martin Wilhelmsson Kammecker
1757–1795 Gabriel Thimotheus Thimotheusson Lütkeman
1795–1796 Karl Fredrik Muhrbeck
1796–1805 Johan Möller
1807–1813 Nils Gardell
1813–1838 Carl Johan Eberstein
1838–1841 Christopher Isac Heurlin
1841–1858 Carl Hallström
1859–1884 Lars Anton Anjou
1885–1920 Knut Henning Gezelius von Schéele
1920–1936 Viktor Rundgren
1936–1947 Torsten Ysander
1948–1950 Gunnar Hultgren
1951–1961 Algot Anderberg
1962–1980 Olof Herrlin
1980–1991 Tore Furberg
1991–2003 Biörn Fjärstedt
2003–2011 Lennart Koskinen
2011–2018 Sven-Bernhard Fast
2018–2022 Thomas Petersson

See also
Churches on Gotland
List of church ruins on Gotland

References

External links

 
Visby
Visby
Religious organizations established in 1572